Jordon Scott Adell (born April 8, 1999) is an American professional baseball outfielder for the Los Angeles Angels of Major League Baseball (MLB). He made his MLB debut in 2020.

Amateur career
Adell graduated from Ballard High School in Louisville, Kentucky in 2017. After his freshman year in 2014, he committed to the University of Louisville to play college baseball. As a junior in 2016, he hit .449 with 11 home runs and 44 runs batted in (RBIs) and had a 1.55 earned run average (ERA) and 56 strikeouts as a pitcher.

Professional career

Draft and minors
Adell was considered one of the top prospects for the 2017 Major League Baseball (MLB) draft. He was selected by the Los Angeles Angels with the tenth overall selection in the draft. Adell began his professional career in June 2017 with the AZL Angels, and after batting .288/.351/.542 with four home runs, 21 RBIs, and 10 stolen bases, he was promoted to the Orem Owlz. He spent the rest of the season with Orem, batting .376/.411/.518 with one home run and nine RBIs in 18 games for them.

In 2018, Adell began the season with the Burlington Bees of the Class A Midwest League, where he hit .326/.398/.611 with six home runs and 29 RBIs in 25 games before being promoted to the Inland Empire 66ers of the Class A-Advanced California League. He was chosen to represent the Angels in the 2018 All-Star Futures Game. After 57 games with the 66ers, he was promoted to the Mobile BayBears of the Class AA Southern League. In 99 games between the three clubs, Adell slashed .290/.355/.543 with 20 home runs, 77 RBIs, and 15 stolen bases.
Adell was among the Angels' non-roster invitees to 2019 spring training, and joined the team there in February. He began the year on the injured list with Mobile. Through 32 games, Adell hit .347 and had six home runs to go along with a 1.018 OPS before being named to the 2019 All-Star Futures Game. Playing right field, Adell went 1-for-2 at the plate with two walks. On August 1, Adell was promoted to the Salt Lake Bees of Class AAA Pacific Coast League. In 2019, playing for three minor league teams, he batted .289/.359/.475 with 10 home runs and 36 RBIs. After the season, he was selected to play in the Arizona Fall League for the Mesa Solar Sox following the season. And also, on October 10, he was selected for the United States national baseball team in the 2019 WBSC Premier 12. In the tournament he batted .394/.429/.697 with 11 hits (tied for the tournament lead), three home runs, and five RBIs in 33 at bats.

Los Angeles Angels

2020
On August 4, 2020, the Angels promoted Adell to the major leagues. He made his debut that night against the Seattle Mariners, going 1-for-4.

On August 29, 2020, Adell hit his first major league home run against Seattle Mariners pitcher Justus Sheffield. That same night, he hit his second major league home run against Aaron Fletcher. Adell finished his rookie season batting .161/.212/.266 with 3 home runs and 7 RBIs in 38 games.

2021
Adell began his 2021 season in triple-A Salt Lake. He was called back up to the major leagues on August 2. He made his season debut the following day, going 3-for-4 with 2 doubles, 3 RBIs and a stolen base against the Texas Rangers. On August 17 against the Detroit Tigers, Adell hit his first career grand slam. Adell finished the season batting .246/.295/.408, hitting 4 home runs and 26 RBIs in 35 games.

References

External links

1999 births
Living people
African-American baseball players
Arizona League Angels players
Ballard High School (Louisville, Kentucky) alumni
Baseball players from Louisville, Kentucky
Burlington Bees players
Inland Empire 66ers of San Bernardino players
Los Angeles Angels players
Major League Baseball outfielders
Mesa Solar Sox players
Mobile BayBears players
Orem Owlz players
Salt Lake Bees players
United States national baseball team players
2019 WBSC Premier12 players
21st-century African-American sportspeople